Morag McLellan (born 2 July 1990) is a Scottish female field hockey player who plays for the Scotland women's national field hockey team. She has represented Scotland in few international competitions including the 2013 Women's EuroHockey Nations Championship, 2010 Commonwealth Games, and 2014 Commonwealth Games.

References 

1990 births
Living people
Scottish female field hockey players
Field hockey players at the 2010 Commonwealth Games
Field hockey players at the 2014 Commonwealth Games
Commonwealth Games competitors for Scotland